Edward J. C. Kewan served as a member of the 1863-65 California State Assembly, representing the 2nd District.

References

Members of the California State Assembly
Year of birth missing
Year of death missing